Angelogelasinus is a genus of tephritid  or fruit flies in the family Tephritidae.

Angelogelasinus species

 Angelogelasinus amuricola (Hendel, 1927)
 Angelogelasinus implicatus (Ito, 1984)
 Angelogelasinus naganoensis (Shiraki, 1933)
 Angelogelasinus venustus (Ito, 1984)

References

Trypetinae
Tephritidae genera